Lincoln Palmer Bloomfield Jr. (born 1952) is an American diplomat and national security adviser who served as Assistant Secretary of State for Political-Military Affairs in the George W. Bush Administration, and as Dan Quayle's Assistant for National Security Affairs.

Early life and education 
Lincoln P. Bloomfield Jr. is the son of Lincoln P. Bloomfield, a political scientist widely-respected as an expert on foreign affairs.  

Bloomfield was educated at Harvard University, graduating cum laude with an A.B. in 1974. He later attended the Fletcher School of Law and Diplomacy at Tufts University, receiving an M.A. in Law and Diplomacy in 1980. During his time at the Fletcher School, he was the Director of The Fletcher Forum of World Affairs.

Career
Upon graduation, Bloomfield joined the office of the Assistant Secretary of Defense for International Security Affairs. In 1988 and 1989, he served as Principal Deputy Assistant Secretary of Defense for International Security Affairs. Bloomfield spent 1989 and 1990 as a Member of U.S. Water Mediation in the Middle East, and later as a member of the U.S. Delegation to Philippine Bases Negotiation.

In 1991, Bloomfield joined the staff of Vice President Dan Quayle as Deputy Assistant to the Vice President for National Security Affairs.

In 1992, Bloomfield joined the United States Department of State as Deputy Assistant Secretary of State for Near Eastern Affairs.

Bloomfield left government service in 1993, joining Armitage Associates LLC, a management consulting firm led by Richard Armitage. He worked there until 2001.

In 2001, George W. Bush nominated Bloomfield as Assistant Secretary of State for Political-Military Affairs. Bloomfield served from May 31, 2001 to January 20, 2005.

In February of 2005, Bloomfield founded Palmer Coates LLC, a consulting firm specializing in strategic planning for international business activities.  He also became a Senior Advisor at Akin Gump Strauss Hauer & Feld.

Bloomfield spent 2008 and 2009 working as President Bush's special envoy for man-portable air-defense systems threat reduction.

Bloomfield is also a member of the board of directors of the Henry L. Stimson Center and a non-executive director of European Metals Holdings. He is also a regular columnist for Foreign Affairs.

References

External links
Biography at Palmer Coates LLC
Profile at Akin Gump
 "Confronting the Iranian Challenge." Testimony to the U.S. House of Representatives Committee on Foreign Affairs, May 8, 2018.

1952 births
Living people
Place of birth missing (living people)
Harvard College alumni
The Fletcher School at Tufts University alumni
United States Department of Defense officials
United States Department of State officials
United States Assistant Secretaries of State
The Stimson Center